Johnson Hippolyte (born 9 June 1964) is an English former professional footballer, who was most recently manager of Staines Town, having been a player-manager at Yeading, and manager at Maidenhead United from 2006 to 2015. He is commonly known by the nickname Drax, on account of his Dracula-style teeth.

During his playing career, he has had spells at Hampton & Richmond, Aldershot Town, Dulwich Hamlet, Chesham United, Chertsey Town, Wealdstone, Chalfont St Peter, Uxbridge and Hounslow.

He began coaching at Chesham and then became joint manager alongside Nas Bashir at Yeading. He took sole control at The Warren in December 2001, and silverware followed with an Isthmian League Cup win in 2003. This was followed by back to back Championship titles as Yeading swiftly moved up the Isthmian League and into the Conference South.

His reputation as manager of Yeading increased with the prestigious FA Cup tie of Newcastle United in the third round of the 2004–05 FA Cup, which was held at Queens Park Rangers' Loftus Road.

He brought FA Cup glory to Maidenhead almost as soon as he arrived at York Road, taking the club to a first round appearance for the first time in 25 years, he then set about winning promotion at the first attempt which was achieved via the playoffs following a late season run of victories. In April 2008, he won the Conference South Manager of the Month award for an unbeaten run which saved the Magpies from relegation. Twelve months later, he led them to their highest ever league finish of sixth place in the Conference South. On 21 October 2011, Hippolyte signed a new contract to remain in charge at York Road until May 2014.

References

External links
 Aylesbury United FC profile

1964 births
Living people
English footballers
Yeading F.C. players
Hampton & Richmond Borough F.C. players
Aldershot Town F.C. players
Dulwich Hamlet F.C. players
Wealdstone F.C. players
Chalfont St Peter A.F.C. players
Chesham United F.C. players
Maidenhead United F.C. players
English football managers
Yeading F.C. managers
Maidenhead United F.C. managers
Staines Town F.C. managers
National League (English football) managers
Association football midfielders